Three for All is a 1975 British musical comedy film directed by Martin Campbell and starring Adrienne Posta, Robert Lindsay, Paul Nicholas, Cheryl Hall, Richard Beckinsale, Graham Bonnet and John Le Mesurier.

Plot
A British marketing executive books a British music group named Billy Beethoven for a tour through Spain to promote Spanish tourism but stipulates that the members of the group must adopt a cowboy image as a gimmick and that their girlfriends will not be coming along because he needs the group to focus on performing. The girlfriends pool their savings and buy their own tickets to Spain to follow their boyfriends. They ward off the advances of several men, most of them also British tourists, and ultimately catch up with their boyfriends at the end of the tour. However, the manager immediately books the band on another tour in the United States without their girlfriends.

Cast
 Adrienne Posta as Diane
 Cheryl Hall as Pet
 Lesley North as Shelley
 Paul Nicholas as Gary
 Graham Bonnet as Kook
 Robert Lindsay as Tom
 Christopher Neil as Ricky
 Richard Beckinsale as Jet Bone
 George Baker as Eddie Boyes
 Simon Williams as Harry Bingley
 Diana Dors as Mrs Ball
 Arthur Mullard as Ben
 John Le Mesurier as Mr Gibbons
 Hattie Jacques as Security Official
 Roy Kinnear as Hounslow Joe
 Liz Fraser as Airport Passenger
 David Kossoff as Airport Passenger
 Anna Quayle as La Pulle
 Ian Lavender as Carlo, Spanish Policeman
 Dandy Nichols as Henrietta
 Edward Woodward as Roadsweeper
 Sheila Bernette as Rhoda

Production
The British group Showaddywaddy appear in the film performing "The Party" from their eponymous 1974 debut album.

It was one of a number of comedies featuring Diana Dors.

References

External links
 

1975 films
1970s musical comedy films
British musical comedy films
Films directed by Martin Campbell
Films about music and musicians
Films set in London
Films set in Spain
1975 comedy films
1970s English-language films
1970s British films